Explicit formulas for eigenvalues and eigenvectors of the second derivative with different boundary conditions are provided both for the continuous and discrete cases. In the discrete case, the standard central difference approximation of the second derivative is used on a uniform grid.

These formulas are used to derive the expressions for eigenfunctions of Laplacian in case of separation of variables, as well as to find eigenvalues and eigenvectors of multidimensional discrete Laplacian on a regular grid, which is presented as a Kronecker sum of discrete Laplacians in one-dimension.

The continuous case
Assuming the equation is defined on the domain , the following are the eigenvalues and normalized eigenvectors. The eigenvalues are ordered in descending order.

Pure Dirichlet boundary conditions

Pure Neumann boundary conditions

Periodic boundary conditions

Mixed Dirichlet-Neumann boundary conditions

Mixed Neumann-Dirichlet boundary conditions

The discrete case
Notation: The index j represents the jth eigenvalue or eigenvector. The index i represents the ith component of an eigenvector. Both i and j go from 1 to n, where the matrix is size n x n. Eigenvectors are normalized. The eigenvalues are ordered in descending order.

Pure Dirichlet boundary conditions

Pure Neumann boundary conditions

Periodic boundary conditions

(Note that eigenvalues are repeated except for 0 and the largest one if n is even.)

Mixed Dirichlet-Neumann boundary conditions

Mixed Neumann-Dirichlet boundary conditions

Derivation of Eigenvalues and Eigenvectors in the Discrete Case

Dirichlet case
In the 1D discrete case with Dirichlet boundary conditions, we are solving

Rearranging terms, we get

Now let . Also, assuming , we can scale eigenvectors by any nonzero scalar, so scale  so that .

Then we find the recurrence

Considering  as an indeterminate,

 
where  is the kth Chebyshev polynomial of the 2nd kind.

Since , we get that

.

It is clear that the eigenvalues of our problem will be the zeros of the nth Chebyshev polynomial of the second kind, with the relation .

These zeros are well known and are:

And using a trig formula to simplify, we find

Neumann case
In the Neumann case, we are solving

The boundary conditions are then equivalent to

If we make a change of variables,

we can derive the following:

with  being the boundary conditions.

This is precisely the Dirichlet formula with  interior grid points and grid spacing . Similar to what we saw in the above, assuming , we get

Relabeling the indices in the formula above and combining with the zero eigenvalue, we obtain,

Dirichlet-Neumann Case

For the Dirichlet-Neumann case, we are solving

,

where 

We need to introduce auxiliary variables 

Consider the recurrence

.

Also, we know  and assuming , we can scale  so that 

We can also write

Taking the correct combination of these three equations, we can obtain

And thus our new recurrence will solve our eigenvalue problem when

Solving for  we get

Our new recurrence gives

where  again is the kth Chebyshev polynomial of the 2nd kind.

And combining with our Neumann boundary condition, we have

A well-known formula relates the Chebyshev polynomials of the first kind, to those of the second kind by

Thus our eigenvalues solve

The zeros of this polynomial are also known to be

And thus

Note that there are 2n + 1 of these values, but only the first n + 1 are unique. The (n + 1)th value gives us the zero vector as an eigenvector with eigenvalue 0, which is trivial. This can be seen by returning to the original recurrence. So we consider only the first n of these values to be the n eigenvalues of the Dirichlet - Neumann problem.

References

Operator theory
Matrix theory
Numerical differential equations
Finite differences